The following is a list of the monastic houses in the West Midlands, England.

See also
 List of monastic houses in England

Notes

References

Medieval sites in England
Houses in the West Midlands (county)
West Midlands
West Midlands
Lists of buildings and structures in the West Midlands (county)